Vinay Kumar Samuel (born 1939) is an Indian Anglican evangelical theologian, known for his work in holistic mission.

Biography 
Samuel was born in Hyderabad, India, as the eldest boy of four children. He became a Christian in his teenage years and studied theology at Union Biblical Seminary, Pune, and completed his graduate studies at the University of Cambridge. He was a minister of St. John's Church, Bangalore (1975–1983) and was founding director of the Oxford Centre for Mission Studies (1992–2001 and 2005–2006). He is presently the executive director of the Oxford Centre for Religion and Public Life.

Samuel's theology is largely shaped by his concern for Christian mission within the Indian context. This has underscored an evangelical understanding of holistic mission, which combines evangelism with social concern for the poor, as well as interfaith dialogue.

Works

References

1939 births
Living people
Indian Anglicans
Indian theologians
World Christianity scholars
Union Biblical Seminary, Pune alumni